Burnham Market is an English village and civil parish near the north coast of Norfolk. It is one of the Burnhams, a group of three adjacent villages that were merged: Burnham Sutton, Burnham Ulph and Burnham Westgate. In 2022, Burnham Market was rated among the "20 most beautiful villages in the UK and Ireland" by Condé Nast Traveler in 2020.

Geography
According to the 2011 census, Burnham Market had a population of 877 people, which fell to 724 people by the 2021 census.

The parish belongs to the district of King's Lynn and West Norfolk.

History

Burnham Market's name is of Anglo-Saxon origin and derives from the Old English for settlement on the River Burn where there is a market.

In 1952, the West Norfolk Junction Railway, which ran through the village, was closed. This railway had linked with Holkham, Wells-next-the-Sea, Hunstanton and Kings Lynn. The station still stands on the road to North Creake.

Burnham Westgate Hall is a Grade II listed country house built in the 1780s by Sir John Soane for Thomas Pitt, 1st Baron Camelford. The Hall was built on the existing Polstede Hall, which had been built in the 1750s by Matthew Brettingham for Pinckney Wilkinson MP. 

In 1933, the Hall passed to the Royal British Legion and after the Second World War it was used as an old people's home. From 1990 onwards, it has become the private residence of Baroness Rawlings.

Churches
Burnham Market is home to several churches.

St. Mary's Church St. Mary's Church is of Norman origin and is dedicated to Mary, mother of Jesus. St. Mary's was significantly remodelled in the fourteenth, fifteenth and nineteenth centuries and is currently listed building. The church bells date to the seventeenth century.

All Saints' Church All Saints' Church is of Norman origin and was heavily remodelled in the fourteenth century, with further minor adjustments being made in the nineteenth century.

St. Henry Walpole Catholic Church Burnham Market's Catholic Church was constructed in 1959 and is dedicated to Saint Henry Walpole, an Elizabethan Catholic martyr. The church conducts weekly Mass on a Friday and Sunday.

Notable residents
 Anne Elliot – English writer and novelist
 Emma Elliot – English writer and novelist
 Sir Mordaunt Martin – British nobleman
 Sir Roger Martin – British nobleman
 Baroness Patricia Rawlings – British politician and antiquarian

References

External links

Burnham Market Village Plan, with detailed Ordnance Survey map
Information from Genuki Norfolk on Burnham Market.

 
Villages in Norfolk
Civil parishes in Norfolk
King's Lynn and West Norfolk